Sherlock may refer to:

Arts and entertainment
 Sherlock Holmes, a fictional detective created by Arthur Conan Doyle
 Sherlock (TV series), a BBC TV series that started in 2010
 Sherlock Hemlock, a Muppet from the TV show Sesame Street
 Sherlock (video game), a 1984 text adventure by Melbourne House
Sherlock: Untold Stories, a Japanese TV series aired in 2019
 Sherlock (EP), by Shinee

People
 Allie Sherlock (born 2005), Irish singer
 Cornelius Sherlock (d.1888), English architect
 Frank Sherlock (born 1969), poet
 Glenn Sherlock (born 1960), American baseball player and coach
 Jack Sherlock (1908–1958), English footballer
 John Michael Sherlock (1926-2019), Canadian Roman Catholic bishop
 James Sherlock (born 1983), pianist
 John Sherlock (c. 1705–1794), Irish-born general in Spain
 Kurt Sherlock (born 1963), rugby player
 Paul Sherlock (born 1973), English footballer
 Richard Sherlock (born 1983), cricketer
 Thomas Sherlock (1678–1761), English bishop and son of William
 William Sherlock (1641–1707), English church leader
 William Sherlock (cricketer) (1881–1937)

Places

Australia
 Sherlock, South Australia, near Tailem Bend
 Sherlock, Western Australia, between Roebourne and Port Hedland:
 Sherlock River (Western Australia)
 Sherlock Station, a pastoral lease

United States
 Sherlock, Texas, an unincorporated community
 Sherlock Township, Finney County, Kansas

Other uses
 Sherlock (software), used by Apple Macintosh, also describing the phenomenon of third-party software being rendered irrelevant by Apple 
 Sherlock (crater), a crater on Earth's Moon in Taurus-Littrow valley

See also
 Sherlock Holmes (disambiguation)
 SHERLOC, spectrometer used in Mars exploration
 Sherlac Point
 Sherluck
 Sherloque Wells, a character in The Flash television series